Liliane Crosa (born 3 July 1942) is a Swiss former figure skater who competed in ladies singles.  She won the gold medal at the Swiss Figure Skating Championships in 1959 and 1960.  She finished 20th at the 1960 Winter Olympics.

References
 

Swiss female single skaters
1942 births
Olympic figure skaters of Switzerland
Figure skaters at the 1960 Winter Olympics
Living people